Sing Along with Acid House Kings is the fourth studio album by Swedish indie pop band Acid House Kings. It was released on 20 April 2005 by Labrador Records.

Critical reception

Tim Sendra of AllMusic hailed Sing Along with Acid House Kings as "one of the best releases, indie or not, of 2005."

Track listing

Personnel
Credits for Sing Along with Acid House Kings adapted from album liner notes.

Acid House Kings
 Johan Angergård – bass, guitar, keyboards, backing vocals
 Niklas Angergård – vocals, guitar, keyboards
 Julia Lannerheim – vocals
 Joakim Ödlund – guitar

Additional musicians
 Anders-Petter Kjellgren – trumpet

Production
 Johan Angergård – production
 Niklas Angergård – production
 Thomas Eberger – mastering

Artwork and design
 Peter Eriksson – artwork
 Kjell B. Persson – photography

References

2005 albums
Acid House Kings albums
Labrador Records albums